DOBES (or DoBeS, an acronym for the German name Dokumentation bedrohter Sprachen "Documentation of Endangered Languages") is an international organization and project. This organization seeks to archive languages due to an expectation that many if not most of the world's languages (currently about 7,000 languages) will diminish.

Notes

External links
 

Endangered languages projects